Johnstownbridge is a Gaelic Athletic Association (GAA) club in County Kildare, Ireland, Winner of three county senior football championships and Kildare club of the year in 1983.

Football
Johnstownbridge field a number of teams at all levels. They were the Kildare Intermediate Champions of 2013. Underage teams field as the parish of Balyna. Paul Cribbin and Daniel Flynn are currently part of the Kildare Senior squad for 2022.

Achievements
 Kildare Senior Football Championship: (3) 1983, 1988, 1989
 Kildare Intermediate Football Championship: 2013
 Kildare Senior Football League Division 2: 2010

Camogie
Johnstownbridge has seen a rejuvenation of Camogie in the last number of years and they now field teams at all levels.

Titles
 All-Ireland Junior Club Camogie Championship Winner 2015

Bibliography
 Kildare GAA: A Centenary History, by Eoghan Corry, CLG Chill Dara, 1984,  hb  pb
 Kildare GAA yearbook, 1972, 1974, 1978, 1979, 1980 and 2000- in sequence especially the Millennium yearbook of 2000
 Soaring Sliothars: Centenary of Kildare Camogie 1904-2004 by Joan O'Flynn Kildare County Camogie Board.

References

External links
Johnstownbridge GAA

Gaelic games clubs in County Kildare
Gaelic football clubs in County Kildare